The following is a list of releases by independent record label Iodine Recordings The label was founded by Casey Horrigan in 1996 and began releasing albums in 1998.  


Main discography

Sub-discographies

Sampler catalog

References
General

Specific

Discographies of American record labels
Punk rock discographies